Ignacio Francisco Dotti Uria (born 18 August 1994) is a Uruguayan rugby player for New Orleans Gold in Major League Rugby (MLR), the highest level of American rugby. His primary position is lock.  

Personal
Dotti attended Ivy Thomas Memorial School and then Universidad ORT.

Career
Dotti made his international debut for Uruguay on 11 April 2015, in a South American Championship game against Paraguay.

In October 2018, Dotti signed for New Orleans Gold to play in the second season of Major League Rugby.  He played 13 times for the Gold in the season.  On 25 August 2019 it was announced he had signed a 1 year extension for he Gold.

He was selected for Uruguay's 31 man squad for the 2019 Rugby World Cup on 30  August 2019.

References

External links

1994 births
Living people
Expatriate rugby union players in the United States
New Orleans Gold players
Rugby union locks
Rugby union players from Montevideo
Uruguayan expatriate rugby union players
Uruguayan expatriate sportspeople in the United States
Uruguay international rugby union players
Uruguayan rugby union players
People educated at Ivy Thomas Memorial School
Peñarol Rugby players